The 1987 Cornell Big Red football team was an American football team that represented Cornell University during the 1987 NCAA Division I-AA football season. Cornell tied for fourth in the Ivy League. 

In its fifth season under head coach Maxie Baughan, the team compiled a 5–5 record and was outscored 197 to 154. Lee Reherman, Gary Rinkus and Dave Quarles were the team captains. 

Cornell's 4–3 conference record tied for fourth in the Ivy League standings. The Big Red was outscored 138 to 128 by Ivy opponents. 

Cornell played its home games at Schoellkopf Field in Ithaca, New York.

Schedule

References

Cornell
Cornell Big Red football seasons
Cornell Big Red football